Hakpara lies in Siraha municipality-22 in Siraha District in the Sagarmatha Zone of south-eastern Nepal. According to the 1991 Nepal census, it had a population of 3395 people living in 595 individual households.

References

External links
UN map of the municipalities of  Siraha District

Populated places in Siraha District